Romell Brathwaite (born 18 March 1982) is a Barbadian international footballer who plays for Notre Dame, as a defender.

Career
Brathwaite played for the Barbadian national team between 2003 and 2008, which included three FIFA World Cup qualifying matches.

References

1982 births
Living people
Barbadian footballers
Barbados international footballers
Notre Dame SC players
Association football defenders